Ricardo Gomes Raymundo (born 13 December 1964) is a Brazilian retired professional footballer and manager. As a player, he played as a central defender, in a 14-year professional career, for Fluminense (six years), Benfica (four) and Paris Saint-Germain (four). Gomes played for Brazil during the 1980s and 1990s, representing the nation at the 1990 World Cup and in two Copa América tournaments.

Subsequently, he went on to have a lengthy managerial career, in both his country and France.

Club career
Born in Rio de Janeiro, Gomes started playing professionally with Fluminense Football Club. With the club, he won three consecutive state leagues, adding the 1984 Série A.

In the middle of 1988, he signed with S.L. Benfica of Portugal, alongside compatriot Valdo, a midfielder. Both were important elements in their debut season, as Benfica won the national championship, a feat which was again accomplished in 1991, with the defender scoring an astonishing 17 goals in both conquests combined, due to his superb aerial ability.

Both Gomes and Valdo left for Paris Saint-Germain F.C. in the middle of 1991, and both would return four years later to Lisbon, having won a total of four titles, including the 1993–94 first division title. In his second Benfica spell, he played sparingly, but still managed to score four times in the league, and helped the team win the domestic cup, before retiring from football in June 1996, at only 31.

International career
During one decade, Gomes won 45 caps for Brazil. He appeared for the nation at two Copa América tournaments, winning the 1989 edition played on home soil, and was present at the 1990 FIFA World Cup, where he played all the matches and minutes until being sent off in the 85th minute for a foul on José Basualdo, in the round of 16 0–1 loss against Argentina.

Gomes was also selected – again as captain – to the 1994 World Cup, but had to be removed from the squad in the last hour, due to injury. Additionally, he was part of the team that won the silver medal at the 1988 Summer Olympics.

Coaching career
Gomes immediately started coaching with Paris Saint-Germain, leaving the French side after two years, having finished second in the 1996–97 season and winning the following season's French Cup. He then returned to his country, managing seven teams until 2004, also having a spell with the Brazilian Olympic team.

In the following four seasons, Gomes worked again in France, with FC Girondins de Bordeaux then going on to manage Monégasque side AS Monaco FC, leaving his post at the latter in late May 2009, with the team eventually ranking 11th.

On 20 June 2009, Gomes signed with São Paulo FC, replacing Muricy Ramalho. In early February 2011, he moved to CR Vasco da Gama, leading his hometown club to its first ever Brazilian Cup, a 3–3 aggregate win against Coritiba Football Club.

On 28 August 2011, 46-year-old Gomes suffered a stroke during the match between Flamengo and Vasco da Gama. He was taken to hospital in an ambulance with the game still playing, and was diagnosed with a life-threatening brain hemorrhage that required emergency head surgery.

On 14 November 2012, after more one year away from football, Gomes came back to Vasco da Gama as technical director. On 22 July 2015, he returned to command Botafogo in the Campeonato Brasileiro Série B.

In August 2016, Gomes was appointed as the head coach of São Paulo FC. However, on 23 November 2016, he was dismissed following poor form which left São Paulo one point away from the relegation zone.

On 5 September 2018, after two months as Santos FC's director of football, Gomes was announced as the head coach of Bordeaux, returning to the post after several weeks following the sacking of previous manager Gus Poyet.

Managerial statistics

Honours

Player
Fluminense
 Campeonato Brasileiro Série A: 1984
 Campeonato Carioca: 1983, 1984, 1985

Benfica
 Primeira Liga: 1989–89, 1990–91
 Taça de Portugal: 1995–96

Paris Saint-Germain
 Ligue 1: 1993–94
 Coupe de France: 1992–93, 1994–95
 Coupe de la Ligue: 1994–95

Brazil
 Pan American Games: 1987
 Olympic Silver Medal: 1988
 Copa América: 1989

Manager
Paris Saint-Germain
 Coupe de France: 1997–98
 Coupe de la Ligue: 1997–98

Vitória
 Copa do Nordeste: 1999
 Campeonato Baiano: 1999

Bordeaux
 Coupe de la Ligue: 2006–07

Vasco da Gama
 Copa do Brasil: 2011

Botafogo
 Campeonato Brasileiro Série B: 2015

References

External links
 
 
 

1964 births
Living people
Footballers from Rio de Janeiro (city)
Brazilian footballers
Brazilian football managers
Brazilian expatriate football managers
Expatriate football managers in France
Association football defenders
Campeonato Brasileiro Série A players
Primeira Liga players
Ligue 1 players
Brazil international footballers
1990 FIFA World Cup players
1987 Copa América players
1989 Copa América players
Copa América-winning players
Olympic footballers of Brazil
Footballers at the 1988 Summer Olympics
Olympic silver medalists for Brazil
Olympic medalists in football
Brazilian expatriate footballers
Expatriate footballers in Portugal
Expatriate footballers in France
Campeonato Brasileiro Série A managers
Ligue 1 managers
Campeonato Brasileiro Série B managers
Fluminense FC players
S.L. Benfica footballers
Paris Saint-Germain F.C. players
Paris Saint-Germain F.C. managers
Sport Club do Recife managers
Esporte Clube Vitória managers
Guarani FC managers
Coritiba Foot Ball Club managers
Esporte Clube Juventude managers
Fluminense FC managers
CR Flamengo managers
FC Girondins de Bordeaux managers
AS Monaco FC managers
São Paulo FC managers
CR Vasco da Gama managers
Botafogo de Futebol e Regatas managers
Pan American Games gold medalists for Brazil
Medalists at the 1988 Summer Olympics
Pan American Games medalists in football
Copa do Nordeste winning managers
Al Nassr FC managers
Expatriate football managers in Saudi Arabia
Brazilian expatriate sportspeople in Saudi Arabia
Footballers at the 1987 Pan American Games
Saudi Professional League managers
Medalists at the 1987 Pan American Games